Galactic Ghoul or galactic ghoul may refer to:

The DR 6 nebula, nicknamed "The Galactic Ghoul"
The Great Galactic Ghoul or "Galactic Ghoul", a fictional space monster on the planet Mars which allegedly consumes Mars probes
"Galactic ghouls", guest stars of a Team Galaxy Halloween episode, see List of Team Galaxy episodes
"Galactic Ghoul", a character on Empowered, see List of Empowered characters